Events in the year 1998 in Burkina Faso.

Incumbents 

 President: Blaise Compaoré
 Prime Minister: Kadré Désiré Ouédraogo

Events 

 15 November – The country's presidential elections are won in a landslide by Blaise Compaoré.

Deaths

References 

 
1990s in Burkina Faso
Years of the 20th century in Burkina Faso
Burkina Faso
Burkina Faso